Leah Naomi Green (born June 14, 1983) is an American poet. She is the author of The More Extravagant Feast, winner of the Walt Whitman award of the Academy of American Poets in 2019. She is Visiting Assistant Professor of English at Washington and Lee University.

Biography
Leah Naomi Green grew up in Greensboro, North Carolina. She graduated from Earlham College in 2005 with a BA in Environmental Studies. In 2009 she earned an MFA in Poetry Writing from the University of California, Irvine.

Green's chapbook, The Ones We Have, was published by Flying Trout Press in 2012, and was awarded the  2012 Flying Trout Chapbook  prize. Green's first poetry collection, The More Extravagant Feast, will be published by Graywolf Press in 2020.  The book won the 2019 Walt Whitman award poetry award, given annually by the Academy of American Poets to an American poet who has not yet published a book. The 2019 winner was selected by poet, Li-Young Lee. She currently teaches English and Environmental Studies at Washington and Lee University.

Selected publications
 The Ones We Have, (Flying Trout Press, 2012)
 
  
 The More Extravagant Feast, (Graywolf Press, 2020)

Awards
 Flying Trout Press Award, The Ones We Have, chapbook, (2012)
Katharine Bakeless Nason Award, (2017)
 Walt Whitman award, The More Extravagant Feast, poetry collection, (2019)

References 

Living people
Writers from Greensboro, North Carolina
University of California, Irvine alumni
Earlham College alumni
American women poets
Poets from North Carolina
Poets from Virginia
Washington and Lee University faculty
21st-century American poets
21st-century American women writers
1983 births